"L'amour est bleu" ("Love Is Blue") is a song whose music was composed by André Popp, and whose lyrics were written by Pierre Cour, in 1967. Bryan Blackburn later wrote English-language lyrics for it. First performed in French by Greek singer Vicky Leandros (appearing as Vicky) as the  entry in the Eurovision Song Contest 1967, it has since been recorded by many other musicians, most notably French orchestra leader Paul Mauriat, whose familiar instrumental version (recorded in late 1967) became the first number-one hit by a French lead artist to top the Billboard Hot 100 in America.

The song describes the pleasure and pain of love in terms of colours (blue and grey) and elements (water and wind). The English lyrics ("Blue, blue, my world is blue …") focus on colours only (blue, grey, red, green, and black), using them to describe components of lost love. The English version by Vicky Leandros also appeared as "Colours of Love" in some locations including the UK.

Eurovision Song Contest 
The Greek-born 17-year-old Vicky Leandros represented Luxembourg at the 1967 Eurovision Song Contest, where she performed "L'amour est bleu"  as the second song of the contest. At the close of voting, the song had received 17 points, placing it fourth in a field of 17, behind "Il doit faire beau là-bas" (France), "If I Could Choose" (Ireland) and the winning song, "Puppet on a String" (United Kingdom).

Despite not winning the Eurovision, Leandros recorded the song in many different languages for release in 19 countries. The song was a modest hit in Europe, and had some success in Japan and Canada (No. 40). The versions she recorded aside from French included English (as "Love Is Blue"), German ("Blau wie das Meer"), Italian ("L'amore è blu") and Dutch ("Liefde is zacht").

The song achieved greater success through cover versions of the song by other artists. Some forty years after its original release, "L'amour est bleu", along with Domenico Modugno's "Nel blu dipinto di blu" (better known as "Volare") and Mocedades' "Eres tú", still counts as one of very few non-winning Eurovision entries ever to become a worldwide hit. The song has since become a favourite of Contest fans, most notably appearing as part of a medley introducing the semi-final of the Eurovision Song Contest 2006 in Athens, one of only three non-winning songs to be involved (the others being "Dschinghis Khan" and "Nel blu dipinto di blu").

It was succeeded as Luxembourgish representative at the 1968 contest by Chris Baldo & Sophie Garel with "Nous vivrons d'amour". Vicky Leandros went on to win the Contest five years later with the song "Après toi", again representing Luxembourg.

Charts

Paul Mauriat version 

According to Paul Mauriat, who conducted/recorded an orchestral "easy listening" version of "Love Is Blue", he chose the song because it was published by his label, Philips Records even though he was not fond of the song. A DJ in Minneapolis played the recording and asked the audience to respond, and was inundated phone calls about the song, and interest in the song then quickly spread around the country. 

The song became a number-one hit in the USA for five weeks in February and March 1968, the first recording by a French artist to top the Billboard Hot 100. (It remained the only French song to top the chart until 2017, when Daft Punk was a featured artist on Canadian artist The Weeknd's number-one hit "Starboy".)  Mauriat's version became a gold record, and its five-week run at the top is the second longest of any instrumental of the Hot 100 era, after "Theme from A Summer Place". The song also spent 11 weeks atop Billboard's Easy Listening survey, and held the longest-lasting title honours on this chart for 25 years. Billboard ranked the record as the No. 2 song for 1968. It is the best-known version of the song in the United States.  The Mauriat recording also reached No. 2 in Canada (No. 12 Year End), and No. 12 on the UK Singles Chart. The Mauriat album containing "Love Is Blue", Blooming Hits, also reached No. 1 on the Billboard Top LP's and Tapes chart for five weeks. The song sold fewer than 30,000 units in France, but 2 million singles and 800,000 LPs were sold in the US. 

Mauriat's version was featured repeatedly in an episode of Chris Carter's television series Millennium titled "A Room with No View", which originally aired on 24 April 1998 on the Fox Network. During the episode, the omnipresent melody is used by a kidnapper to brainwash a group of youths. His version is also briefly heard in The Simpsons episodes "There's No Disgrace Like Home" and "The Blue and the Gray." It was played over the closing credits of Mad Men'''s sixth-season episode "The Flood", which takes place during April 1968. The harpsichord riff from Mauriat's version was also sampled by the English electronica duo J Walk in their song "French Letter", as part of their 2002 album A Night on the Rocks.

Charts
Weekly charts

All-time charts

 Other covers 
 Three other songs charted on Billboard'' Hot 100 together with Paul Mauriat's version at the same time in 1968.  Al Martino's "Love is Blue" peaked at No. 57 on the Billboard Hot 100 and No. 3 on the Billboard Adult Contemporary charts, and was the title song of one of his 1968 albums.  Claudine Longet's "Love Is Blue (L'amour est bleu)" peaked at No. 71, while Manny Kellem's version reached No. 100.
 Jeff Beck recorded a "rock" interpretation of Mauriat's version in 1968. It reached No. 20 in Ireland, and No. 23 on the UK Singles Chart.
 The Dells recorded a soul medley, "I Can Sing a Rainbow/Love Is Blue", which reached No. 22 in the Billboard Hot 100 and No. 5 in the Billboard R&B Singles charts in the US, No. 10 in the Dutch chart, No. 18 in Ireland, and No. 16 in the UK charts, in 1969.

References

External links 

 Official Eurovision Song Contest site, history by year, 1967.

1967 songs
1968 singles
Songs written by Pierre Cour
Songs written by André Popp
Jeff Beck songs
Andy Williams songs
Mercy (band) songs
Billboard Hot 100 number-one singles
Cashbox number-one singles
Eurovision songs of 1967
Eurovision songs of Luxembourg
French-language songs
Philips Records singles
1960s instrumentals